The Salvation Army USA Central Territory is one of the four territories The Salvation Army is divided into within the US. The Central Territory covers 11 states in the heart of the US, and is headquartered in Hoffman Estates, Illinois. The Central Territory is subdivided into 10 different divisions, all under different leaders, each reporting directly to the territorial commander. Each of the divisions has their own headquarters and also camp facilities.

The Central Territory runs 2,342 centers of operations, including Churches ("corps community centers"), Social Service centers, camps, and many other types of operations, and Adult Rehabilitation Centers. The college that all officers (pastors in The Salvation Army) must attend, known as the College for Officer Training, is a two-year college which is located in the Lake View neighborhood of Chicago, Illinois.

See also
Generals of The Salvation Army
Chief of the Staff of The Salvation Army
High Council of The Salvation Army
Officer (The Salvation Army)
Soldier (The Salvation Army)
The Salvation Army U.S.A. Western Territory

References

Sources

External links
The Salvation Army USA Central Territory

Central Territory
Religion in the Midwestern United States